Stewart Fraser may refer to:
Stewart Fraser (footballer) (born 1936), Scottish footballer
Stewart Fraser (politician) (1895–1965), Australian politician
Stewart Fraser (rower), British rower
Stewart Fraser, co-founder of social networking site KILTR

See also
Stuart Fraser (disambiguation)